Calippus is an extinct genus of hoofed-mammals in the horse family (Equidae), known from the Middle Miocene through the Early Pliocene of North and Central America. Fossils have been found in the central and Eastern United States ranging south to Honduras. These equines had high crowned teeth and a quadrangular, wide muzzle, and were small compared to their contemporary relatives,  with C. elachistus weighing 49 kg, C. cerasinus weighing 102 kg,  132 kg for C. theristes and 73 kg for C. mccartyi.

References 

Miocene horses
Pliocene odd-toed ungulates
Prehistoric placental genera
Miocene mammals of North America
Pliocene mammals of North America
Barstovian
Clarendonian
Hemphillian
Blancan
Fossil taxa described in 1930